The 2003 Dubai Tennis Championships and Dubai Duty Free Women's Open were tennis tournaments played on outdoor hard courts at the Aviation Club Tennis Centre in Dubai in the United Arab Emirates that were part of the International Series Gold of the 2003 ATP Tour and of Tier II of the 2003 WTA Tour. The men's tournament was held from 24 February through 2 March 2003 while the women's tournament was held from 17 February through 22 February 2003. Roger Federer and Justine Henin-Hardenne won the singles titles.

Finals

Men's singles

 Roger Federer defeated  Jiří Novák 6–1, 7–6(7–2)
 It was Federer's 2nd title of the year and the 10th of his career.

Women's singles

 Justine Henin-Hardenne defeated  Monica Seles 4–6, 7–6(7–4), 7–5
 It was Henin-Hardenne's 1st title of the year and the 9th of her career.

Men's doubles

 Leander Paes /  David Rikl defeated  Wayne Black /  Kevin Ullyett 6–3, 6–0
 It was Paes' 1st title of the year and the 27th of his career. It was Rikl's 1st title of the year and the 27th of his career.

Women's doubles

 Svetlana Kuznetsova /  Martina Navratilova defeated  Cara Black /  Elena Likhovtseva 6–3, 7–6(9–7)
 It was Kuznetsova's 2nd title of the year and the 7th of her career. It was Navratilova's 2nd title of the year and the 343rd of her career.

External links
 Official website
 ATP tournament profile
 WTA tournament profile

 
2003
Dubai Tennis Championships
Dubai Duty Free Women's Open